A list of animated television series first aired in 2001.

See also
 List of animated feature films of 2001
 List of Japanese animation television series of 2001

References

Television series
Animated series
2001
2001
2001-related lists